Sars-et-Rosières is a commune in the Nord department in northern France. It's noted as a castle. The Château du Loir, was constructed in the 15th century. Its ruins are a protected monument.

Heraldry

See also
Communes of the Nord department

References

Sarsetrosieres